Macrobrachium is a genus of freshwater prawns or shrimps characterised by the extreme enlargement of the second pair of pereiopods, at least in the male.

Species 
It contains these species:

Macrobrachium acanthochirus F. Villalobos, 1967
Macrobrachium acanthurus (Wiegmann, 1836)
Macrobrachium acherontium Holthuis, 1977
Macrobrachium adscitum Riek, 1951
Macrobrachium aemulum (Nobili, 1906)
Macrobrachium agwi Klotz, 2008
Macrobrachium ahkowi Chong & Khoo, 1987
Macrobrachium altifrons (Henderson, 1893)
Macrobrachium amazonicum (Heller, 1862)
Macrobrachium americanum Spence Bate, 1868
Macrobrachium amplimanus Cai & Dai, 1999
Macrobrachium andamanicum (Tiwari, 1952)
Macrobrachium aracamuni Rodríguez, 1982
Macrobrachium asperulum (von Martens, 1868)
Macrobrachium assamense (Tiwari, 1958)
Macrobrachium atabapense S. Pereira, 1986
Macrobrachium atactum Riek, 1951
Macrobrachium auratum Short, 2004
Macrobrachium australe (Guérin-Méneville, 1838)
Macrobrachium australiense Holthuis, 1950
Macrobrachium banjarae (Tiwari, 1958)
Macrobrachium bariense (De Man, 1892)
Macrobrachium birai Lobão, Melo & Fernandes, 1986
Macrobrachium birmanicum Schenkel, 1902
Macrobrachium bombajense Almelkar & Sankolli, 2006
Macrobrachium borellii (Nobili, 1896)
Macrobrachium brasiliense (Heller, 1862)
Macrobrachium brevicarpum Tan & Dong, 1996
Macrobrachium bullatum Fincham, 1987
Macrobrachium cacharense (Tiwari, 1952)
Macrobrachium caledonicum (Roux, 1926)
Macrobrachium callirrhoe (De Man, 1898)
Macrobrachium canarae (Tiwari, 1958)
Macrobrachium carcinus (Linnaeus, 1758)
Macrobrachium catonium H. H. Hobbs III & H. H. Hobbs Jr., 1995
Macrobrachium cavernicola (Kemp, 1924)
Macrobrachium chevalieri (Roux, 1935)
Macrobrachium clymene (De Man, 1902)
Macrobrachium cocoense Abele & W. Kim, 1984
Macrobrachium cosolapaense Mejía-Ortíz & López-Mejía, 2011
Macrobrachium cortezi Rodríguez, 1982
Macrobrachium cowlesi Holthuis, 1950
Macrobrachium crebrum Abele & W. Kim, 1989
Macrobrachium crenulatum Holthuis, 1950
Macrobrachium dalatense Nguyên, 2003
Macrobrachium dayanum (Henderson, 1893)
Macrobrachium denticulatum Ostrovski, Da Fonseca & Da Silva-Ferreira, 1996
Macrobrachium depressimanum S. Pereira, 1993
Macrobrachium dienbienphuense Đăng & B. Y. Nguyên, 1972
Macrobrachium dierythrum S. Pereira, 1986
Macrobrachium digitus Abele & W. Kim, 1989
Macrobrachium digueti (Bouvier, 1895)
Macrobrachium dolatum Cai, Naiyanetr & Ng, 2004
Macrobrachium dolichodactylus (Hilgendorf, 1879)
Macrobrachium duri Wowor & Ng, 2010
Macrobrachium dux (Lenz, 1910)
Macrobrachium edentatum Liang & Yan, 1986
Macrobrachium elatum Jayachandran, 1987
Macrobrachium elegantum Pan, Hou & S. Li, 2010
Macrobrachium empulipke Wowor, 2010
Macrobrachium equidens (Dana, 1852)
Macrobrachium esculentum (Thallwitz, 1891)
Macrobrachium faustinum (de Saussure, 1857)
Macrobrachium felicinum Holthuis, 1949
Macrobrachium ferreirai Kensley & Walker, 1982
Macrobrachium feunteuni Keith & Vigneux, 2002
Macrobrachium foai (Coutière, 1902)
Macrobrachium forcipatum Ng, 1995
Macrobrachium formosense Spence Bate, 1868
Macrobrachium fukienense Liang & Yan, 1980
Macrobrachium gallus Holthuis, 1952
Macrobrachium gangeticum Spence Bate, 1868
Macrobrachium glabrum Holthuis, 1995
Macrobrachium gracilirostre (Miers, 1875)
Macrobrachium grandimanus (Randall, 1840)
Macrobrachium gua Chong, 1989
Macrobrachium guangxiense Liang & Yan, 1981
Macrobrachium gurudeve Jayachandran & Raji, 2005
Macrobrachium hainanense (Parisi, 1919)
Macrobrachium hancocki Holthuis, 1950
Macrobrachium handschini (Roux, 1933)
Macrobrachium hendersodayanum (Tiwari, 1952)
Macrobrachium hendersoni (De Man, 1906)
Macrobrachium heterochirus (Wiegmann, 1836)
Macrobrachium heterorhynchos Guo & He, 2008
Macrobrachium hildebrandti (Hilgendorf, 1893)
Macrobrachium hirsutimanus (Tiwari, 1952)
Macrobrachium hirtimanus (Olivier, 1811)
Macrobrachium hobbsi Villalobos Hiriart & Natees Rodriguez, 1990
Macrobrachium holthuisi Genofre & Lobão, 1978
Macrobrachium horstii (De Man, 1892)
Macrobrachium idae (Heller, 1862)
Macrobrachium idella (Hilgendorf, 1898)
Macrobrachium iheringi (Ortmann, 1897)
Macrobrachium inca Holthuis, 1950
Macrobrachium indicum Jayachandran & Joseph, 1986
Macrobrachium inflatum Liang & Yan, 1985
Macrobrachium inpa Kensley & Walker, 1982
Macrobrachium insulare (Parisi, 1919)
Macrobrachium jacatepecense Mejía-Ortíz & López-Mejía, 2011
Macrobrachium jacobsoni Holthuis, 1950
Macrobrachium japonicum (De Haan, 1849)
Macrobrachium jaroense (Cowles, 1914)
Macrobrachium jayasreei Jayachandran & Raji, 2005
Macrobrachium jelskii (Miers, 1877)
Macrobrachium jiangxiense Liang & Yan, 1985
Macrobrachium johnsoni Ravindranath, 1979
Macrobrachium joppae Holthuis, 1950
Macrobrachium kelianense Wowor & Short, 2007
Macrobrachium kempi (Tiwari, 1949)
Macrobrachium kistnense (Tiwari, 1952)
Macrobrachium kiukianense (Yu, 1931)
Macrobrachium koombooloomba Short, 2004
Macrobrachium koreana De Kwon, 1984 
Macrobrachium kulkarnii Almelkar & Sankolli, 2006
Macrobrachium kunjuramani Jayachandran & Raji, 2005
Macrobrachium lamarrei H. Milne-Edwards, 1837
Macrobrachium lanatum Cai & Ng, 2002
Macrobrachium lanceifrons (Dana, 1852)
Macrobrachium lanchesteri (De Man, 1911)
Macrobrachium lantau (Chow, Chan & Tsang, 2022)
Macrobrachium lar (Fabricius, 1798)
Macrobrachium latidactylus (Thallwitz, 1891)
Macrobrachium latimanus (von Martens, 1868)
Macrobrachium lepidactyloides (De Man, 1892)
Macrobrachium lepidactylus (Hilgendorf, 1879)
†Macrobrachium leptodactylus (De Man, 1892)
Macrobrachium leucodactylus Wowor & Choy, 2001
Macrobrachium lingyunense J. Li, Cai & Clarke, 2006
Macrobrachium lopopodus Wowor & Choy, 2001
Macrobrachium lorentzi (Roux, 1921)
Macrobrachium lucifugum Holthuis, 1974
Macrobrachium lujae (De Man, 1912)
Macrobrachium macrobrachion (Herklots, 1851)
Macrobrachium maculatum Liang & Yan, 1980
Macrobrachium madhusoodani Unnikrishnan, P. M. Pillai & Jayachandran, 2011
Macrobrachium malayanum (Roux, 1935)
Macrobrachium malcolmsonii (H. Milne-Edwards, 1844)
Macrobrachium mammillodactylus (Thallwitz, 1892)
Macrobrachium manipurense (Tiwari, 1952)
Macrobrachium manningi Pereira & Lasso, 2007
Macrobrachium mazatecum Mejía-Ortíz & López-Mejía, 2011
Macrobrachium meridionale Liang & Yan, 1983
Macrobrachium michoacanus Villalobos Hiriart & Nates Rodriguez, 1990
Macrobrachium microps Holthuis, 1978
Macrobrachium mieni Đăng, 1975
Macrobrachium minutum (Roux, 1917)
Macrobrachium miyakoense Komai & Fujita, 2005
Macrobrachium moorei (Calman, 1899)
Macrobrachium naso (Kemp, 1918)
Macrobrachium nattereri (Heller, 1862)
Macrobrachium natulorum Holthuis, 1984
Macrobrachium neglectum (De Man, 1905)
Macrobrachium nepalense Kamita, 1974
Macrobrachium niloticum (Roux, 1833)
Macrobrachium niphanae Shokita & Takeda, 1989
Macrobrachium nipponense (De Haan, 1849)
Macrobrachium nobilii (Henderson & Matthai, 1910)
Macrobrachium novaehollandiae (De Man, 1908)
Macrobrachium oaxacae Mejía-Ortíz & López-Mejía, 2011
Macrobrachium occidentale Holthuis, 1950
Macrobrachium oenone (De Man, 1902)
Macrobrachium ohione (Smith, 1874)
Macrobrachium olfersii (Wiegmann, 1836)
Macrobrachium oxyphilus Ng, 1992
Macrobrachium panamense Rathbun, 1912
Macrobrachium pantanalense dos Santos, Hayd & Anger, 2013
Macrobrachium patheinense Phone & Suzuki, 2004
Macrobrachium patsa (Coutière, 1899)
Macrobrachium pectinatum S. Pereira, 1986
Macrobrachium peguense (Tiwari, 1952)
Macrobrachium pentazona He, Gao & Guo, 2009
Macrobrachium petersii (Hilgendorf, 1879)
Macrobrachium petiti (Roux, 1934)
Macrobrachium petronioi Melo, Lobão & Fernandes, 1986
Macrobrachium phongnhaense (Tu & Cuong, 2015)
Macrobrachium pilimanus (De Man, 1879)
Macrobrachium pilosum Cai & Dai, 1999
Macrobrachium placidulum (De Man, 1892)
Macrobrachium placidum (De Man, 1892)
Macrobrachium platycheles Ou & Yeo, 1995
Macrobrachium platyrostris (Tiwari, 1952)
Macrobrachium poeti Holthuis, 1984
Macrobrachium potiuna (Müller, 1880)
Macrobrachium praecox (Roux, 1928)
Macrobrachium pumilum S. Pereira, 1986
Macrobrachium purpureamanus Wowor, 1999
Macrobrachium quelchi (De Man, 1900)
Macrobrachium raridens (Hilgendorf, 1893)
Macrobrachium rathbunae Holthuis, 1950
Macrobrachium reyesi S. Pereira, 1986
Macrobrachium rhodochir Ng, 1995
Macrobrachium rodriguezi S. Pereira, 1986
Macrobrachium rogersi (Tiwari, 1952)
Macrobrachium rosenbergii (De Man, 1879)
Macrobrachium rostratum X. Wang, 1997
Macrobrachium rude (Heller, 1862)
Macrobrachium sabanus Ng, 1994
Macrobrachium saengphani  Saengphan, Panijpan, Senapin, Suksomnit & Phiwsaiya, 2020
Macrobrachium saigonense Nguyên, 2006
Macrobrachium sankolli Jalihal & Shenoy in Jalihal, Shenoy & Sankolli, 1988
Macrobrachium santanderensis Garcia-Perez & Villamizar, 2009
Macrobrachium sbordonii Mejía-Ortíz, Baldari & López-Mejía, 2008
Macrobrachium scabriculum (Heller, 1862)
Macrobrachium scorteccii Maccagno, 1961
Macrobrachium shaoi Cai & Jeng, 2001
Macrobrachium shokitai Fujino & Baba, 1973
Macrobrachium sintangense (De Man, 1898)
Macrobrachium sirindhorn Naiyanetr, 2001
Macrobrachium siwalikense (Tiwari, 1952)
Macrobrachium sollaudii (De Man, 1912)
Macrobrachium spinipes (Schenkel, 1902)
Macrobrachium spinosum Cai & Ng, 2001
Macrobrachium srilankense Costa, 1979
Macrobrachium striatum N. N. Pillai, 1991
Macrobrachium sulcatus (Henderson & Matthai, 1910)
Macrobrachium sulcicarpale Holthuis, 1950
Macrobrachium sundaicum (Heller, 1862)
Macrobrachium suongae Nguyên, 2003
Macrobrachium superbum (Heller, 1862)
Macrobrachium surinamicum Holthuis, 1948
Macrobrachium tenellum (Smith, 1871)
Macrobrachium tenuirostrum X. Wang, 1997
Macrobrachium thai Cai, Naiyanetr & Ng, 2004
Macrobrachium therezieni Holthuis, 1965
Macrobrachium thuylami Nguyên, 2006
Macrobrachium thysi Powell, 1980
Macrobrachium tiwarii Jalihal, Shenoy & Sankolli, 1988
Macrobrachium tolmerum Riek, 1951
Macrobrachium totonacum Mejía, Alvarez & Hartnoll, 2003
Macrobrachium transandicum Holthuis, 1950
Macrobrachium tratense Cai, Naiyanetr & Ng, 2004
Macrobrachium trichodactylum Liang, Liu & Chen in Li, Liu, Liang & Chen, 2007
Macrobrachium tuxtlaense Villalobos & Alvarez, 1999
Macrobrachium unikarnatakae Jalihal, Shenoy & Sankolli, 1988
Macrobrachium urayang Wowor & Short, 2007
Macrobrachium veliense Jayachandran & Joseph, 1985
Macrobrachium venustum (Parisi, 1919)
Macrobrachium vicconi Román, Ortega & Mejía, 2000
Macrobrachium vietnamiense Đăng in Đăng & B. Y. Nguyên, 1972
Macrobrachium villalobosi H. H. Hobbs Jr., 1973
Macrobrachium villosimanus (Tiwari, 1949)
Macrobrachium vollenhoveni (Herklots, 1857)
Macrobrachium walvanense Almelkar, Jalihal & Sankolli, 1999
Macrobrachium wannanense Dai & Tan, 1993
Macrobrachium weberi (De Man, 1892)
Macrobrachium yui Holthuis, 1950
Macrobrachium zariquieyi Holthuis, 1949

References

External links

Palaemonidae
Freshwater crustaceans
Taxa named by Charles Spence Bate